Woodward Park may refer to:

Woodward Park (Fresno)
Woodward Park (Tulsa)